The following is a list of schools in Sri Lanka.

 List of schools in Central Province, Sri Lanka
 List of schools in Eastern Province, Sri Lanka
 List of schools in Northern Province, Sri Lanka
 List of schools in North Central Province, Sri Lanka
 List of schools in North Western Province, Sri Lanka
 List of schools in Sabaragamuwa Province
 List of schools in Southern Province, Sri Lanka
 List of schools in Uva Province
 List of schools in Western Province, Sri Lanka

See also 

 List of the oldest schools in Sri Lanka